The following is a list of albums Decca Records has produced.

78 rpm

10" vinyl LPs

12" vinyl LPs

References

Lists of albums